Battle of the Butterflies is a 1924 German silent drama film directed by Franz Eckstein and starring Asta Nielsen, Reinhold Schünzel and Hans Brausewetter. It is based on a play by Hermann Sudermann. It was shot at the National Studios in Berlin.

Cast

References

Bibliography

External links

1924 films
Films of the Weimar Republic
German silent feature films
Films based on works by Hermann Sudermann
Films directed by Franz Eckstein
National Film films
German black-and-white films
1924 drama films
German drama films